Grâce-Hollogne is a municipality of Wallonia located in the province of Liège, Belgium. The municipality is effectively a part of the greater Liège conurbation, separated from Liège city centre by the municipality of Saint-Nicolas. Included within its boundaries is Liège Airport.

On 1 January 2006 Grâce-Hollogne had a total population of 21,753. The total area is 34.24 km2, which gives a population density of approximately 635 inhabitants per km2.

Geography
The municipality consists of the following districts: Bierset, Grâce-Berleur, Hollogne-aux-Pierres, Horion-Hozémont, and Velroux.

History 
Grâce-Hollogne was formed by the grouping of former municipalities Bierset, Grâce-Berleur, Hollogne-aux-Pierres, Horion-Hozémont, and Velroux, along with part of Mons-lez-Liège.

The killing of four demonstrators on 30 July 1950 in Grâce-Berleur was one of the most significant moments in the so-called Royal Question of 1950, which grew out of resentment towards King Leopold III and his actions in World War II.

In June 1995 it was from Grâce-Hollogne that Julie Lejeune and Mélissa Russo were infamously abducted to become victims of the notorious serial killer and child molester Marc Dutroux. One of the municipality's schools is now named École Julie et Melissa in honour of the murdered girls, and flowers are still left regularly on the Julie & Melissa Monument.

Economy
Avient Aviation has its Continental Europe offices on the property of Liège Airport.

See also

 List of protected heritage sites in Grâce-Hollogne

References

External links 
 
 Municipality site 
 Flag of Grâce-Hollogne
 Massacre at Grace-Berleur, 1950 (in French)
 Photo of the Julie & Melissa monument, Grâce-Hollogne

 
Municipalities of Liège Province